Đorđe Nešković (Serbian Cyrillic: Ђорђе Нешковић; born 15 November 1991 in Belgrade, Yugoslavia) is a Serbian curler. He is the captain of the Serbian national curling team. Nešković represented Serbia at the 2009, 2010, 2011, 2013, 2014, 2015, 2016, 2017 European Championship. At the 2013 European Curling Championships Group C with his teammates Bojan Mijatović, Goran Ungurović and Filip Stojanović, he won a bronze medal, first ever Serbian curling medal. He and his teammates are coached by Danish Olympian Camilla Jensen.

References

External links
Đorđe Nešković at Curling World Federation

Living people
1991 births
Serbian male curlers
Sportspeople from Belgrade